Stammheim Prison is a prison in Stuttgart, Baden Württemberg, Germany. It is situated on the northern boundaries of Stuttgart in the city district of Stuttgart-Stammheim, right between fields and apartment blocks on the fringes of Stammheim. The prison was built as a supermax prison between 1959 and 1963 and taken into operation in 1964.

History

Red Army Faction (1975) 
Stammheim Prison became famous when it housed the leading members of the Red Army Faction urban guerrilla (RAF) group during their trials, as well as the courthouse in which they were tried. The section in which they were kept was specially built in 1975 and at the time recognised as one of the most secure prison blocks in the world: the roof and the courtyard was covered with steel mesh. During the night the precinct was illuminated by fifty-four spotlights and twenty-three neon bulbs. Special forces were guarding the roof, including snipers. Four hundred police officers along with the Federal Office for the Protection of the Constitution patrolled the building. The mounted police officers oscillated on a double shift. One hundred more GSG-9 units reinforced the police during the trial. BKA agents guarded the front of the court area. Finally there were helicopters flying around the area.

Faction member deaths (1976–77) 

Ulrike Meinhof was found hanged on 9 May 1976. In the aftermath, prison censors allowed through parcels with instructions for the surviving prisoners to follow suit, complete with ropes "sufficient to do the job". Andreas Baader, Gudrun Ensslin, and Jan-Carl Raspe reportedly committed suicide in the high security block during the night of 18 October 1977, which became known as the "Death Night" for the leaders of the Red Army Faction. Baader and Raspe were said to have shot themselves, whereas Ensslin apparently chose a method of supposed suicide similar to that of Meinhof. A fourth member, Irmgard Möller, allegedly stabbed herself four times in the chest with a stolen knife. She survived her suicide attempt and has since stated that the deaths were not suicide, but rather extrajudicial killings undertaken by the German government of the time, a claim strongly denied by the German governments former and present.

The deaths of the prisoners were among the events collectively known as the German Autumn, which also included a series of terrorist attacks and the West German government's response.

Restructuring and extension (2005–17) 
Officials in Baden-Württemberg announced in August 2007 plans to tear down the section of Stammheim prison where the leaders of the RAF terrorist group were held during the 1970s. They considered demolishing the high-rise building because it was in need of renovation and new prison quarters would be built on the site of the demolished building. These plans were adjusted in the following years. Five additional buildings were built between 2007 and 2017, connected to a tract built in 2005. Together, the extensions can house up to 559 prisoners. The two original buildings were renovated from 2019 onwards to provide capacity for a total of 822 inmates in Stammheim prison.

References

External links

  (in German)
 Sinnbild für das Ende der Terroristen, article about Stammhein Prison in the  Stuttgarter Zeitung

Prisons in Germany
Red Army Faction
Buildings and structures in Stuttgart
1964 establishments in West Germany